Hypographa phlegetonaria is a species of moth of the family Geometridae first described by Achille Guenée in 1857. It is found in Australia, including Tasmania.

References

Oenochrominae
Moths of Australia
Moths described in 1857